Longimactra is a genus of large marine bivalve molluscs or clams, in the family Mactridae.

Species in the genus Longimactra
 Longimactra elongata (Quoy and Gaimard, 1835)

References
 Powell A. W. B., New Zealand Mollusca, William Collins Publishers Ltd, Auckland, New Zealand 1979 

Mactridae
Bivalves of New Zealand
Bivalve genera
Taxa named by Harold John Finlay